Bobbi Sue Luther (born August 27, 1978) is an American model, actress, film producer, and host of TLC's Junkyard Mega Wars.

Life and career
Luther was born in Annapolis, Maryland. She played an Orion Slave Girl on Star Trek: Enterprise as well as a newsreader in Deuce Bigalow: European Gigolo. She then was selected to advance to the last 28 candidates of the 2004 WWE Diva Search, but was not chosen to be one of the 10 finalists. In March 2007, Luther was named the new face of St. Pauli Girl beer.  She was in season five episode six "The Smoking Jacket" of Curb Your Enthusiasm as a Playboy girl and appeared in season two, episode five titled "Goodbye to That" of Terminator: The Sarah Connor Chronicles. She is also the spokeswoman for Lynx body spray, a brand that is called the Bond Film of Advertising.

Luther has been in, and on the cover of, numerous publications.

Luther, in partnership with Jennifer Reuting, co-founded Cuties for Canines, Inc., a 501(c)3 non-profit foundation. This is a privately funded organization and relies on volunteer workers and donations in order to rescue dogs from animal shelters and place them in homes.

Filmography
 Aftermath (2014) ... Basement Refugee
 Crazy Kind of Love (2013) ... Bartender
 Judy Moody and the Not Bummer Summer (2011) ... Young Woman
 Night of the Demons (2010) ... Suzanne
 Made in Romania (2010) ... Bambi Kleist
 Laid to Rest (2009) ... The Girl/Princess Gemstone
 The Slammin' Salmon (2009) ... Cod Customer No. 1
 Extreme Movie (2008) ... Gabriela
 Terminator: The Sarah Connor Chronicles (2008) ... Bar Skank (1 episode)
 Killer Pad (2008) ... Amber Waves
 The Poughkeepsie Tapes (2007) ... Josephine
 Gameface (2007) ... Tabitha
 Curb Your Enthusiasm (2005) ... Bobbi Sue Luther (1 episode)
 Deuce Bigalow: European Gigolo (2005) ... Newscaster
 Come as You Are (2005) ... Amber
 Star Trek: Enterprise (2004) ... "Borderland", Orion Slave Woman (1 episode)
 Boy-Next-Door (2004) ... Kennedy (Short film)
 The Dana & Julia Show (2004) ... Waitress (TV movie)
 Dude... We're Going to Rio (2003) ... Hot Airline Attendant

Producer credits
 Paradise City (2021) (8 episodes)
 Sherman's Showcase (2020-2021) (7 episodes)
 Sylvie's Love (2020)
 Miss Virginia (2019)
 The Devil Has a Name (2019)
 Nostalgia (2017) 
 Dog Years (2017)
 Unsullied (2015)
 Primrose Lane (2015) (short) 
 The Boy (2015) (line producer)
 Wasted Beauty (2014) (short)
 The ABCs of Death 2 (2014)
 Prey (2014) (co-producer)
 Crazy Kind of Love (2013)
 Remnants (2011)
 Judy Moody and the Not Bummer Summer (2011) (executive producer)
 Amongst Brothers (2010) (executive producer)
 The Somnambulist (2010)
 Fear Clinic (2009) (5 episodes)
 Laid to Rest (2009)

References

External links

1978 births
Living people
Actresses from Maryland
American female models
American film actresses
American film producers
American game show hosts
American women film producers
American women philanthropists
American women television producers
Female models from Maryland
People from Annapolis, Maryland
21st-century American women